This list of the monastic houses in Bristol includes abbeys, priories, friaries and other monastic religious houses in Bristol.

{| style="width:99%;" class="wikitable"
|-
! style="width:15%;"|Foundation
! style="width:5%;"|Image
! style="width:30%;"|Communities and provenance! style="width:20%;"|Formal name or dedication and alternative names!width=10%|References and location
|- valign=top
|Bedminster Monastery
|
|possible Saxon monastic or secular foundationparochial church of St John probably built on site, rebuilt 1854, destroyed by bombing in World War II
|
| (probable)

|- valign=top
|Bristol Austin Friars #
|
|Augustinian Friars (under the Limit of Oxford)founded 1313 by Sir Simon and Sir William Montacute;vacation house for alien students 1362;dissolved September 1538; granted to Maurice Dennis c.1543
|
|
|- valign=top
|Bristol Blackfriars ^
|
|Dominican Friars (under the Visitation of London)founded 1227/8 by Sir Maurice [de] Gaunt;dissolved 10 September 1528 (1538?); granted to William Chester; subsequently The Friars Quaker meeting house; then Bristol Register Office; currently in use as a restaurant
|
|
|- valign=top
|Bristol Eremites Friars #
|
|Friars Eremites
|
|
|- valign=top
|Bristol Friars of the Sack #
|
|Friars of the Sackfounded before 1266; dissolved after 1286; friars had left before 1322, though church continued in use
|
|
|- valign=top
|Bristol Greyfriars #
|
|Franciscan Friars Minor, Conventual (under the Custody of Bristol)founded before 1230/34; dissolved 10 September 1538; granted to Mayor and citizens of Bristol c.1541
|Saint Francis
|
|- valign=top
|Bristol Whitefriars #
|
|Carmelite Friarsfounded 1256/1267 by Edward, Prince of Wales (the future Edward I); dissolved 1538; site successively occupied by a mansion and a boys' school; site now occupied by Colston Hall
|The Blessed Virgin Mary
|
|- valign=top
|St James's Priory, Bristol +
|
|Benedictine monksfounded 1120s, built by Robert, Earl of Gloucester, son of Henry I; dissolved 1539; granted to Henry Brayne c.1543; nave in parochial use 1374; fell into disuse 1980s; in custodianship of the Little Brothers of Nazareth since 1996
|The Priory Church of Saint James, Bristol
|
|- valign=top
|Bristol — St Mary Magdalen Nunnery #
|
|Augustinian Canonessesfounded 1173 by Eva, widow of Robert Fitzharding;also given as Benedictinedissolved 1536; granted to Henry Brayne and John Marsh;King David Inn built on site
|St Mary Magdalene
|
|- valign=top
|Bristol — St Philip's Priory
|
|Benedictine monksfounded c.900
|The Church of Saint Philip and Saint Jacob, Bristol
|
|- valign=top
|Bristol — St Stephen's Priory
|
|Benedictine monksrecorded as a cell dependent on Glastonbury Abbey, Somerset
|
|
|- valign=top
|Bristol Cathedral Abbey: St Augustine's Abbey, Bristol +
|
|Augustinian Canons Regular — Victorinefounded 1140-2 by Robert Fitzharding; first canons transferred from Shobdon Priory, Herefordshire (1120 or) 1148;dissolved 9 December 1539;episcopal diocesan cathedral founded 1542; extant
|The Abbey Church of Saint Augustine of Canterbury, BristolThe Cathedral Church of the Holy and Undivided Trinity, Bristol
|
|- valign=top
|Bristol Preceptory
|
|Knights Templarchurch built on site of templar church, now in ruins
|
|
|- valign=top
|Westbury Priory
|
|Saxon minster, college of secular priestsfounded 716; granted to Worcester Cathedral 824;probably destroyed in Danish raids 9th century;Benedictine monksrefounded c.963–964 by Bishop Oswald;12 monks transferred to new site at Ramsey Abbey, Huntingdonshire 972; priory lapsed thereafter; refounded c.1093, cell dependent on Worcester; lapsed before c.1112; refounded 1125; college of secular priests 1194; parochial church built on site
|The Priory Church of the Blessed Virgin Mary, Westbury on TrymWestbury on Trym Priory;Westbury Minster
|
|}

See also
 List of monastic houses in England

Notes

References

History of Bristol
England in the High Middle Ages
Medieval sites in England
Lists of buildings and structures in Bristol
Archaeological sites in Bristol
.
.
Bristol
Bristol